Anahydrophorus is a genus of flies in the family Dolichopodidae. It contains only one species, Anahydrophorus cinereus. It is recorded from southern Spain and Portugal in Europe, and it is widely distributed along the coasts of North Africa (Algeria, Morocco, Tunisia).

References 

Dolichopodidae genera
Hydrophorinae
Monotypic Diptera genera
Diptera of Europe
Diptera of Africa
Taxa named by Theodor Becker
Fauna of Spain
Fauna of Portugal
Insects of North Africa
Fauna of Algeria
Fauna of Morocco
Fauna of Tunisia